Toronto Arrows R.F.C. is a rugby union club based in Toronto, Ontario, Canada, that plays in Major League Rugby. The Arrows team is an independent off-shoot of the Ontario Blues provincial programme and is funded by a group of private investors and supporters.

History

The team was founded as the Ontario Arrows in 2017 with the intent of joining the Major League Rugby (MLR) competition for the 2019 season. The Arrows debuted September 9, 2017, in a match against the Glendale Merlins losing 41–7.

In spring 2018, the Arrows played a six-game exhibition schedule against the Houston SaberCats, Rugby United New York, Utah Warriors, and Boston's Mystic River Rugby Club. The schedule was extended to include games against the Canada Selects. The Arrows' 2018 home opener was a decided victory over the Mystic River Rugby Club.

In July 2018, the Arrows announced that MLR had granted them exclusive rights to negotiate for a franchise in Ontario. In November 2018, MLR announced that the Arrows had joined the league for the 2019 season. At the same time, the Ontario Arrows changed their name to the Toronto Arrows. The ownership group is led by Bill Webb, partner and chief investment officer at Waypoint Investment Partners. The ownership group also includes the former general manager of the Toronto Maple Leafs Brian Burke, Boat Rocker Sports (a division of Boat Rocker Media), Duncan McNaughton, an assistant coach with the Canadian women's team and the Queen's University men, Kevin Reed of AR3 Capital, and John Ferraro of Mass Marketing Inc. As MLR operates as a single entity league, the ownership group purchased an equity stake in the league, at the cost of a few million dollars, and received operating rights to a franchise in the Toronto market. In the 2019 season the team split its home games between Alumni Field of York University and Lamport Stadium in its inaugural 2019 MLR season. 

After playing only five matches in 2020, the Arrows ceased play, along with the rest of the league, as the COVID-19 pandemic began.

Due to border crossing concerns related to the COVID-19 pandemic during the 2021 season, the Arrows temporarily relocated to Marietta, Georgia, to share Rugby ATL's facilities at Lupo Family Field.  For the 2022 season, the Arrows hosted their game against the LA Giltinis at Starlight Stadium, marking the first MLR regular season game to be held in British Columbia. The remainder of their home games were played at the renovated York Lions Stadium, over 1,000 days after the team's previous home game in Toronto.

Broadcasts
For 2019, home games were shown on GameTV. Lincoln Rose and Kit McConnico were the on-air talent.

For 2020, TSN was announced as the Arrows broadcast partner. Following the cancellation of the 2020 Major League Rugby season, TSN produced a 10-episode series, showing 60-minute highlights from chosen Arrows games, called "Arrows in an Hour."

Sponsorship

Players and personnel

Current squad 

The Toronto Arrows squad for the 2023 Major League Rugby season is:

 Senior 15s internationally capped players are listed in bold.
 MLR teams are allowed to field up to 10 overseas players per match. Due to trades, Toronto is limited to 8 players per match for the 2023 season.

Head coaches
  Chris Silverthorn (2019–2021)
  Peter Smith (2021–present)

Captains
 Lucas Rumball (2019)
 Dan Moor, Lucas Rumball (2020) (co-captains)
 Lucas Rumball, Ben LeSage (2021) (co-captains)
 Mike Sheppard (2022)
Lucas Rumball, Sam Malcolm (Vice Captains)
 Lucas Rumball (2023)
Sam Malcolm, Mike Sheppard (Vice Captains)

Team Staff

, the members of the team staff are:

 Peter Smith — Head Coach 
 Rob Howley — Attack Coach
 Francois Ratier - Defence & Skills Coach
 Francisco Deformes — Forwards Coach
 Cory Hector — Arrows Academy Director & Head Coach
 Alex Lee - Head of Performance
 Shane Cahill - Assistant Strength & Conditioning Coach
 Richard Owen - Head Performance Analyst
 Neil MacDougall - Team Manager
 Scott Shannon — Head Athletic Therapist
 Chris Chan - Senior Team Physiotherapist
 Terri Jones - Academy Athletic Therapist
 Dr. John Gillis - Head Team Physician
 Chris Silverthorn - Director of Player Development

Front Office
 Bill Webb - President and General Partner
 Tim Matthews - Vice President and General Manager
 Rahul Srinivasan - Chief Commercial Officer
 Mark Winokur - Co-Founder and Special Advisor

Records

Season standings

Notes

Honors
Major League Rugby
Playoff appearances: 2019

2018 season (exhibition)
All games in the 2018 season were exhibition games and did not count in the league standings.

2019 season

Exhibition

Regular season

Post season

2020 season

On March 12, 2020, MLR announced the season would go on hiatus immediately for 30 days due to the COVID-19 pandemic. On March 19, 2020, MLR announced that they had cancelled the season and all remaining games for 2020.

Regular season

2021 season 

Due to the Canadian federal government  closing the border between the USA and Canada in response to the Covid-19 pandemic, Toronto relocated to Marietta, Georgia for the 2021 season. Although intended to be for the start of the season, the ongoing pandemic meant that all of the Arrow’s “home” games were played at Lupo Family Field, sharing the ground with Rugby ATL for the season.

Regular season

2022 season

Regular season

2023 season

Regular season

References

External links
 

 
Major League Rugby teams
 
Rugby teams in Toronto
Rugby clubs established in 2017